In ufology, a close encounter is an event in which a person witnesses an unidentified flying object. This terminology and the system of classification behind it were first suggested in astronomer and UFO researcher J. Allen Hynek's 1972 book The UFO Experience: A Scientific Inquiry. Categories beyond Hynek's original three have been added by others but have not gained universal acceptance, mainly because they lack the scientific rigor that Hynek aimed to bring to ufology.

Hynek's scale became well known after being referenced in a 1977 film, Close Encounters of the Third Kind, which is named after the third level of the scale. Promotional posters for the film featured the three levels of the scale, and Hynek himself makes a cameo appearance near the end of the film.

Hynek's scale
Hynek devised a sixfold classification for UFO sightings: They are arranged according to increasing proximity:

Nocturnal lights
Lights in the night sky

Daylight discs
UFOs seen in the daytime, generally having discoidal or oval shapes

Radar-visual
UFO reports that have radar confirmation—these supposedly try to offer harder evidence that the objects are real, although radar propagation can be occasionally discredited due to atmospheric propagation anomalies

Close encounters of the first kind

Close encounters of the second kind
A UFO event in which a physical effect is alleged; this can be interference in the functioning of a vehicle or electronic device, animals reacting, a physiological effect such as paralysis or heat and discomfort in the witness, or some physical trace like impressions in the ground, scorched or otherwise affected vegetation, or a chemical trace

Close encounters of the third kind

UFO encounters in which an animated entity is present—these include humanoids, robots, and humans who seem to be occupants or pilots of a UFO

Bloecher subtypes
UFO researcher Ted Bloecher proposed six subtypes for the close encounters of the third kind in Hynek's scale:

A (Aboard) : An entity is observed only inside the UFO.
B (Both) : An entity is observed inside and outside the UFO.
C (Close) : An entity is observed near to a UFO, but not going in or out.
D (Direct) : An entity is observed—no UFOs are seen by the observer, but UFO activity has been reported in the area at about the same time.
E (Excluded) : An entity is observed, but no UFOs are seen and no UFO activity has been reported in the area at that time.
F (Frequence) : No entity or UFOs are observed, but the subject experiences some sort of "intelligent communication".

Extensions of Hynek's scale

Close encounters of the fourth kind
A close encounter of the fourth kind is a UFO event in which a human is abducted by a UFO or its occupants. This type was not included in Hynek's original close encounters scale.

Hynek's erstwhile associate Jacques Vallee argued in the Journal of Scientific Exploration that the fourth kind should refer to "cases when witnesses experienced a transformation of their sense of reality", so as to also include non-abduction cases where absurd, hallucinatory or dreamlike events are associated with UFO encounters.

The film The Fourth Kind makes reference to this category.

Close encounters of the fifth kind
A close encounter of the fifth kind is a UFO event claiming direct communication between aliens and humans.

See also
Contactee
Extraterrestrial hypothesis
First contact (science fiction)
List of reported UFO sightings

References

General

Ufology